Leandro Delantar Alvarez (March 23, 1950 – February 11, 2014), better known by his screen name Roy Alvarez, was a Filipino actor, director and screenwriter for film, television and theater in the Philippines.

Biography
He was born on March 23, 1950 in Pagbilao, Quezon, Philippines as Leandro Delantar Alvarez. He finished his Bachelor of Science in Commerce at the University of Santo Tomas in Manila, Philippines. He lived for some time in the United States.

He was also a lecturer and speaker on Consciousness Development, Inner and Outer Ecology, Healing Mother Earth and Zero Waste Management.

In March 1989, he signed an eight-picture deal with Viva Films, and was set to star in the film Imortal alongside Vilma Santos and Christopher de Leon; however, he eventually dropped out of the project.

Personal life
He was married to Nieves Campa and they have a daughter, Miren Alvarez who is married to Paolo Fabregas, a son of his friend and fellow actor Jaime Fabregas.

Death
Alvarez died on February 11, 2014, due to cardiac arrest, a month before his 64th birthday.
His remains is at Garden of Divine Word
At Christ The King Semenary in Quezon City
He is survived by his wife, Nieves Campa-Alvarez, and daughter, Miren Alvarez-Fabregas.

Filmography

Film

Television

References

External links

Pinoy-showbiz.biz

1950 births
2014 deaths
Male actors from Quezon
Filipino male film actors
Filipino male television actors

GMA Network personalities
ABS-CBN personalities